Gadhvacha Lagna or Gadhvache Lagna is a 2007 Indian Marathi-language Comedy film directed by Raju Phulkar and produced by S.B Pardeshi. The film stars Makarand Anaspure, Rajshree Landge, Sanjay Khapre in lead roles. It was scheduled to be theatrically released on 1 January 2007.

Plot

Cast and Crew

Cast 
 Makarand Anaspure as Savlya Kumbhar
 Rajshree Landge as Gange
 Sanjay Khapre as Sadya
 Sonalee Kulkarni as Rambha 
 Sharad Ponkshe

Supporting Cast 
 Kiran Ronge
 Siddeshwar Zadbuke
 Dipak Alegaokar
 Mukund Fansalkar
 Imtiaz Bagvan
 Anvay Bendre
 Gazhal Dabholkar
 Ranjeet Magdoom
 Nandu Pol as King
 Sumira Gujar 
 Jyoti Joshi 
 Nandini Jog 
 Praksh Dhootre

Crew 
 P.R.O (Public Relations Official): P.K. Bone 
 Marketing and Publicity: Shrikant Dhondge, Sanket, Shreyas 
 Art and Costume Designer: Raju Phulkar
 Choreographer: Narendra Pandit
 Music Cinematography: Raju Phulkar
 Head of Production: Hemant Gadekar
 Production Manager: Hemant Giri
 Executive Producer: Ravi Bartakke (Nashik)
 Executive Advisor: Harshit Abhiraj
 Co-producer: Eknath Kudle
 Concept: S.B. Pardeshi (Subhash Pardeshi)

Soundtrack 

Music is composed by Bal Palsule and Songs are composed by Jagdish Khebudkar.

References

External links 
 

2007 films
Indian comedy films